The 2019–20 St. Francis Brooklyn Terriers women's basketball team represented St. Francis College during the 2019–20 NCAA Division I women's basketball season.  The Terrier's home games were played at the Generoso Pope Athletic Complex. The team has been a member of the Northeast Conference since 1988. St. Francis Brooklyn was coached by Linda Cimino, who was in her second year at the helm of the Terriers.

The Terriers finished the season at 8–21 overall, and 4–14 in conference play. They finished in 10th place and failed to qualify for the NEC Tournament.

Previous season

The Terriers finished the 2018–19 season 18–13, 12–6 in NEC play. The Terriers proceeded to lose in the first round of the NEC tournament to Mount St. Mary's. Their 12 conference victories are the most in program history.

Roster

Schedule

|-
!colspan=12 style="background:#0038A8; border: 2px solid #CE1126;;color:#FFFFFF;"| Non-Conference Regular Season

  

|-
!colspan=12 style="background:#0038A8; border: 2px solid #CE1126;;color:#FFFFFF;"| Northeast Conference Regular Season

Awards

 Nevena Dimitrijevic
1x NEC Player of the Week
7x NEC Rookie of the Week
NEC Rookie of the Year Award
Selected to All-NEC Rookie Team
 Ally Lassen

Selected to All-NEC Third Team

See also
2019–20 St. Francis Brooklyn Terriers men's basketball team

References

St. Francis Brooklyn
St. Francis Brooklyn Terriers women's basketball seasons
Saint Francis Brooklyn Terriers women's basketball
Saint Francis Brooklyn Terriers women's basketball